"Can't Get You Out of My Thoughts" is a song by Dum Dums, released as their second single in 2000. It was also included on their album It Goes Without Saying.

Track listing
 CD1
(Released June 26, 2000)
 "Can't Get You Out of My Thoughts" - 3:10
 "Boyband" - 4:18
 "Plastic Flowers" - 4:24

 CD2
(Released June 26, 2000)
 "Can't Get You Out of My Thoughts" - 3:10
 "All Hooked Up on You" - 3:36
 "Equal Spread of Sunshine" - 4:23
 "Can't Get You Out of My Thoughts (Video)"

Chart performance
"Can't Get You Out of My Thoughts" entered the UK Singles Chart the week of 26-06-2000 at #18.

References 

Dum Dums (band) songs
2000 singles
2000 songs